Michael James Ellam  (born 4 October 1968) is a British banker and former civil servant.

Biography 
Ellam was educated at Forest Hill School, before studying economics at Peterhouse, Cambridge from 1987 to 1990 and at the London School of Economics from 1990 to 1991. A career Civil Servant, he joined HM Treasury in 1993. He held a succession of posts including Private Secretary to Chancellor Kenneth Clarke, Head of Debt and Reserves Management and Director of Policy. He was appointed Director of Communications at 10 Downing Street under Gordon Brown from 2007 to 2009. In 2009, he returned to HM Treasury as Director General International Finance continuing into the premiership of David Cameron.

He was appointed Chairman of the EU Financial Services Committee in 2011. He joined HSBC in 2013 and is currently Co-Head of Public Sector Banking in the Global Banking and Markets Division.

He was awarded a Companion of the Order of the Bath by Her Majesty Queen Elizabeth II in the 2014 New Year Honours for services to international finance policy.

References

External links 

 Michael Ellam on IMDb

1968 births
Living people
British civil servants
British political consultants
British special advisers
Alumni of Peterhouse, Cambridge
HSBC people